Březová is a municipality and village in Zlín District in the Zlín Region of the Czech Republic. It has about 500 inhabitants.

Notable people
František Čuba (1936–2019), agronomist and politician

References

Villages in Zlín District